The United States participated at the 2018 Summer Youth Olympics in Buenos Aires, Argentina from 6 October to 18 October 2018.

Medalists

Archery

The United States qualified two archers based on its performance at the 2017 World Archery Youth Championships.

Individual

Team

Athletics

Badminton

The United States qualified one player based on the Badminton Junior World Rankings.

Singles

Team

Basketball

The United States qualified a girls' team based on its performance at the 2017 FIBA 3x3 U18 World Cup. The United States later qualified a boys' team based on the U18 3x3 National Federation Ranking.

 Boys' tournament - 1 team of 4 athletes
 Girls' tournament - 1 team of 4 athletes

Shoot-out contest

Skills Competition

Beach volleyball

The United States qualified a girls' team based on their performance at the 2018 Central Zone U19 Championship.

 Girls' tournament - 1 team of 2 athletes

Boxing

Boys

Girls

Canoeing

The United States qualified three boats based on its performance at the 2018 World Qualification Event.

 Boys' K1 - 1 boat
 Girls' C1 - 1 boat
 Girls' K1 - 1 boat

Diving

Equestrian

The United States qualified a rider based on its performance at the FEI North American Junior Championships.

 Individual Jumping - 1 athlete

Fencing

The United States qualified six athletes based on its performance at the 2018 Cadet World Championship.

 Boys' Épée - Isaac Herbst
 Boys' Foil - Kenji Bravo
 Boys' Sabre - Robert Vidovszky
 Girls' Épée - Emily Vermeule
 Girls' Foil - May Tieu
 Girls' Sabre - Alexis Anglade

Golf

Individual

Team

Gymnastics

Artistic
The United States qualified two gymnasts based on its performance at the 2018 American Junior Championship.

 Boys' artistic individual all-around - 1 quota
 Girls' artistic individual all-around - 1 quota

Rhythmic
The United States qualified one gymnast based on its performance at the 2018 American Junior Championship.

 Girls' rhythmic individual all-around - 1 quota

Trampoline
The United States qualified one gymnast based on its performance at the 2018 American Junior Championship.

 Girls' trampoline - 1 quota

Roller speed skating

The United States qualified two roller skaters based on its performance at the 2018 Roller Speed Skating World Championship.

 Boys' combined speed event - Sabien Tinson
 Girls' combined speed event - Corinne Stoddard

Rowing

The United States qualified two boats based on its performance at the 2017 World Junior Rowing Championships.

 Boys' single sculls - 1 athlete
 Girls' pair – 2 athletes

Rugby sevens

The United States qualified a boys' team based on its performance at the 2018 Americas North qualification tournament, with Canada electing to send its boys' field hockey team instead based on quotas.

Roster

 Tyren Al-Jiboori
 Max Clark
 Alex Cleary
 Lauina Falatea
 Jasper Green
 Isaia Kruse
 Sione Mahe
 Zachary Neff
 Uluamu Niutupuivaha
 Jon Rodriguez
 Inoke Waqavesi
 Ben Wierenga

Group stage

Fifth place game

Sailing

The United States qualified one boat based on its performance at the North American and Caribbean Nacra 15 Qualifiers. The nation later qualified two more boats based on their performance at the North American Windsurfing Championship. An IKA Twin Tip boat was qualified through its performance at the 2018 World Championship.

 Boys' Techno 293+ - 1 boat
 Boys' IKA Twin Tip Racing - 1 boat
 Girls' Techno 293+ - 1 boat
 Mixed Nacra 15 - 1 boat

Sport climbing

The United States qualified two sport climbers based on their second-place and third-place finishes in the youth A combined event of the 2017 World Youth Sport Climbing Championships.

 Girls' combined - 2 quotas (Ashima Shiraishi, Brooke Raboutou)

However neither Shiraishi nor Raboutou was included in the final list of starting athletes for the Summer Youth Olympics. The US Olympic Committee declined to allow them to participate, citing a fixed limit on the total number of athletes that it could send to all events, and a low prioritization of the climbing event based on the fact that, as a sport new to the Olympics, USA Climbing had applied for recognition by the USOC but not yet received it.

Swimming

United States qualified eight swimmers.

Table tennis

The United States qualified two table tennis players based on its performance at the North American Continental Qualifier.

 Boys' singles - Kanak Jha
 Girls' singles – Amy Wang

Taekwondo

Tennis

Singles

Doubles

Triathlon

The United States qualified two athletes based on its performance at the 2018 American Youth Olympic Games Qualifier.

Individual

Relay

Weightlifting

The United States qualified two athletes based on its performance at the 201? ??? Youth Championships.

Boy

Girl

Wrestling

Key:
  – Victory by Fall
  – Without any points scored by the opponent
  – With point(s) scored by the opponent
  – Without any points scored by the opponent
  – With point(s) scored by the opponent

Boys

Girls

References

External links
NOC Schedule

2018 in American sports
Nations at the 2018 Summer Youth Olympics
United States at the Youth Olympics